Basel Evangelical Mission Parsi School (BEMP) was founded by the German Basel Mission in 1856 in Thalassery as the Basel Mission German School. Its name was later changed to the Basel Mission German Parsi School after a Parsi philanthropist Kaikose Ruderasha donated funds to the school. During the World War II, owing to political reasons, the "German" in the school's name was changed to "Evangelical".

Notable alumni 

Dr. Ayyathan Gopalan
A. K. Gopalan
 K. Kelappan
 Nettur P. Damodaran
 K. Ananda Nambiar
 Vittaldas Leeladhar
 C. H. Kanaran
 E. Ahamed
 A.N. Shamseer
 Oyyarathu Chandu Menon

See also 
 Educational Institutions in Thalassery

References

Christian schools in Kerala
High schools and secondary schools in Kerala
Schools in Kannur district
Education in Thalassery
Educational institutions established in 1856
1856 establishments in India